Pythais scutigera is a species of beetle in the family Cerambycidae, and the only species in the genus Pythais. It was described by Vigors in 1826.

References

Compsosomatini
Beetles described in 1826
Monotypic beetle genera